Tim Godfrey is a Nigerian gospel singer. He is best known for his song Nara in collaboration with Travis Greene. He is the founder and owner of the record label Rox Nation and also the Founder of Xtreme Crew.

Career

Early life and career beginnings
Timothy Chukwudi Godfrey was born on the 26th day of August in the year 1980 to the Family of Mr. and Mrs. Victor Godfrey in Kaduna, Nigeria. He is the second born of his parents that has six (6) children. He had his primary education in Kaduna Nigeria, although he hails from Abia State. He got an honorary Doctorate degree in Fine Art and Musicology at the Trinity International University of Ambassadors, Georgia, USA in 2018.

Career highlights
Tim Godfrey is the convener of the annual Fearless Gospel Concert, which has hosted several international gospel artists, including Marvin Sapp, Kirk Franklin, Travis Greene, Israel Houghton, JJ Hairston, Sammie Okposo and others.

In 2018, Tim Godfrey featured Travis Greene in the breakout hit song, Nara, which has earned over 60 million views on Youtube. In 2019, he featured Israel Houghton on the single, Toya and collaborated with JJ Hairston on the single Onaga off the latter's album.

Since 2016, Tim Godfrey has been a regular feature at  the Experience concert .

Personal life
Tim Godfrey got married on Saturday, April 23 2022 to his fiancé Erica, who he had proposed to on Valentine's day.

Songs 
2014 - 2017 

2017 - 2019

Awards and nominations 

 BEFFTA Awards – 2011
 Best Artiste of the year nominee at the Future Awards – 2012
 NEA Award U.S.A. for the Best Gospel Artist/Group of the year – 2012
 Nine nominations at the Crystal Award – 2015
 Eight nominations at the Africa Gospel Awards (AGAFEST) – 2018
 Male Artists of Excellence at Africa Gospel and Media Awards (AGAMA) – 2019
 Tim Godfrey and The Xtreme Crew bagged the Musical Group of Excellence award at the Africa Gospel and Media Awards (AGAMA) – 2019
 Male African Artiste of the Year at the GTMA Awards – 2019
 Songs of Excellence award at the Africa Gospel and Media Awards (AGAMA) – 2019
 Male artiste of the year at Africa Gospel Awards (AGAFEST) – 2019
 Best International Artist nominee at the Premier Gospel Awards – 2019

See also
 List of Nigerian gospel musicians

References

Living people
1979 births